Spinach (Spinacia oleracea) is an edible flowering plant in the family of Amaranthaceae.

Spinach may also refer to:

Botany
 Amaranthus dubius, known as red spinach or Chinese spinach
 Atriplex hortensis, known as mountain spinach or French spinach
 Basella alba, known as Malabar spinach, red vine spinach, creeping spinach or climbing spinach
 Chard (Beta vulgaris), also known as spinach beet, silverbeet or perpetual spinach
 Chenopodium bonus-henricus, also known as Lincolnshire spinach
 Cleome serrulata, known as Navajo spinach
 Ipomoea aquatica, known as water spinach, river spinach or Chinese spinach
 Morogo, or African spinach, referring to a group of at least three different dark green leafy vegetables 
 Rumex acetosa, also known as spinach dock
 Tetragonia tetragonioides, known as New Zealand spinach or sea spinach

Other uses
 Spinach (moth) (Eulithis mellinata), a moth of the family Geometridae
 Spinach aptamer, a synthetic RNA aptamer designed as a mimic of green fluorescent protein

See also
 Chinese spinach (disambiguation)
 Wild spinach